The  is a subway line, part of the Fukuoka City Subway system in Fukuoka, Japan. It connects Meinohama, Nishi Ward to Fukuokakūkō (Fukuoka Airport), Hakata Ward, all within Fukuoka. The line's color on maps is orange. Officially, the line is called . The line has a through service with JR Chikuhi Line. Like other Fukuoka City Subway lines, stations are equipped with automatic platform gates, and trains are automatically operated by ATO system. However, JR train cars (from Chikuhi Line) are operated manually.

This is the only subway line in Japan that directly links to an airport. Although Toei Asakusa Line trains in Tokyo also serve airports (Narita and Haneda), those are not the stations of the Asakusa Line itself. Rather, they are the stations of suburban lines that the Asakusa Line has through services with.

The Kūkō Line goes through many important areas of the city, namely Nishijin, Tenjin, Hakata, and the airport.

Station list 

Through services to/from the Hakozaki Line do not continue onto the Chikuhi Line (and vice versa); they terminate at Meinohama Station instead.

Rolling stock

Fukuoka Subway
 1000 series (since 1981)
 2000 series (since 1992)

JR Kyushu
 103-1500 series (since 1982)
 303 series (since 2000)
 305 series (since 2015)

A fleet of six new 305 series 6-car electric multiple unit (EMU) commuter trains was introduced on through services to and from the Chikuhi Line from February 2015.

See also
Airport rail link
List of railway lines in Japan

References

External links 
 Fukuoka City Subway official website 
 Fukuoka City Subway official website 

 
Fukuoka City Subway
Airport rail links in Japan
1067 mm gauge railways in Japan
Railway lines opened in 1981
1981 establishments in Japan